The Vanderbilt Commodores women's basketball team represents Vanderbilt University in the Eastern Division of the Southeastern Conference (SEC). The Commodores have never won the regular season SEC championship, although they have won six SEC tournament titles (1993, 1995, 2002, 2004, 2007 and 2009); the SEC has awarded its official championship based solely on regular-season record since the 1985–86 season. The team is coached by Shea Ralph, entering her first season, following an abbreviated 2020-21 season that was canceled after eight games due to COVID-19 issues, opt-outs, player injuries and transfer requests under fifth-year head coach Stephanie White.

Memorial Gymnasium

The Commodores play their home games in Memorial Gymnasium. Memorial Gymnasium was built in the early 1950s. It was dedicated as the campus memorial to students and alumni killed in World War II; a plaque commemorating those who died is displayed in the Gym's North lobby.

At the time of the Gym's construction, there was a serious discussion within the Vanderbilt community about whether the school should de-emphasize intercollegiate athletics and refocus on its academic program.  As a compromise between those who advocated increased athletics competition and those who argued in favor of de-emphasis, the Gymnasium was built to hold only about 9,000 seats, and it would be readily adaptable to other uses—significantly, as a possible concert hall.

Consequently, the gymnasium floor was built up above its surroundings, more in the nature of a stage. The areas out of bounds along the sidelines were very wide, in contrast with the small facility which it replaced, where the walls were right along the sidelines and players could scrape their shoulders bringing the ball up the court.  This necessitated the placement of the benches at the end of the court, which was not highly unusual at the time.

Memorial Gym is well known for its unusual design.  The end-of-the-floor bench location is now unique in major college basketball, and SEC coaches who travel to Memorial, along with coaches from other schools who have played at Vanderbilt as a post-season venue, have said that the unusual setup gives Vanderbilt a tremendous home court advantage, since no other facility in which opponents play is arranged in such a way.

Current roster

Year by year results

Conference tournament winners noted with # Source

Postseason results

NCAA Division I

AIAW Division I
The Commodores made one appearance in the AIAW National Division I basketball tournament, with a combined record of 0–1.

Other awards and honors
 Jence Ann Rhoads, 2011 First Team All-SEC
 Elan Brown, 2010 All-SEC Rookie Team
 Tiffany Clarke, 2010 All-SEC Rookie Team
 Merideth Marsh, 2010 Second Team All-SEC
 Jence Ann Rhoads, 2010 First Team All-SEC
 Jennifer Risper, 2008-09 Vanderbilt women's Co-Athletes of the Year
 Jennifer Risper, Women's Basketball Coaches Association (WBCA), National Defensive Player of the Year (2009)
 Jennifer Risper, SEC All-Tournament Team (2009)
 Jennifer Risper, SEC All-Defensive Team (2008)
 Jennifer Risper, Second-team All-Southeastern Conference honouree (2008)
 Jennifer Risper, All-tournament honors at the 2007 Contra Costa Times in Berkeley, California
 Jennifer Risper, All-tournament selection (2007 Vanderbilt Thanksgiving Tournament.)
Jennifer Risper, Female Newcomer of the Year honors among all Vanderbilt student-athletes (2006)
Christina Wirth, Earned All-Tournament honors at the 2006 VU Holiday Classic.
Christina Wirth, All-tournament honors at the 2007 Contra Costa Times Classic in Berkeley, Calif
Christina Wirth, Most Valuable Player of the 2007 Vanderbilt Thanksgiving Tournament
Christina Wirth, Named a first-team All-Southeastern Conference honoree (2008)
Christina Wirth, Second-team recognition from the Associated Press (2008)
Christina Wirth, Named preseason All-SEC by league coaches (first team) and writers (second team) (2008)
Christina Wirth, Named to the CoSIDA Academic All-District IV third team(2008)
Christine Wirth, All-Senior All-America First Team by the Lowe's Senior CLASS Award committee.
Christine Wirth, All-SEC Honors
Christine Wirth, SEC Tournament Most Valuable Player
Christine Wirth, SEC All-Tournament Team
Christina Wirth has received honorable mention on the 2009 State Farm Coaches' All-America Team
Christina Wirth, 2008-09 Vanderbilt women's Co-Athletes of the Year

Player awards

SEC Awards
Player of the Year
Chantelle Anderson - 2002

See also
Vanderbilt Commodores men's basketball

References

External links
 

 
Basketball in Nashville, Tennessee